Sutton Grange is a small country town located approximately  south of Bendigo in Victoria, Australia.

It has a very small population of approximately 150 people, most of which consist of old sheep farming families. In the 1930s Sutton Grange was a prosperous little town bigger than those surrounding it today, but due to a large bushfire all establishments and housing was burnt to the ground, and only the land remained.

The only public facility now remaining is the local public/community hall in the centre of town.

A war memorial across the road from the hall dates from 1922.

Sutton Grange is now more widely known for its fine food and wine, boasting the Sutton Grange Organic Farm or Holy Goat Cheese, Colliers Fine Chocolates and several successful wineries and Broad's Dairy. Sutton Grange is also known for its horse racing, hosting Sutton Grange Winery/Stud and its fine Merino wool, which is some of the best in Australia.

History
Sutton Grange Post Office opened on 1 August 1865 and closed in 1970.

The 1930s bushfire was a tragic disaster for Sutton Grange. A once prosperous little town, with pubs, a butter factory, school, church and post office was burnt to ashes, and that brought an end to its prosperity. Still widely known as one of the best wool growing areas in Victoria, it also is home to some of Australia's best shearers. Wool growing families that keep this reputation as good as it is, are the Bartys, the Collisons, the Davises, the Barkers and the Bickfords. The Bartys are famous in the wool trade as having some of the best fine Merino wool in Australia.

The old school in Sutton Grange is now privately owned and last taught children in 1990. The beautiful "A" lined building is built out of granite from the Mount Alexander granite quarries, and is now heritage listed, similar relics can also be found close by, such as an old bridge, used back in the 1930s, butter wells, from the old factory, and the post office's steps on a lawn owned privately by Ania and Piotr Zimon until 2007.

Trade
The major commodities currently produced in Sutton Grange are wool, wine and dairy products. Countless sheep farms, wineries and two dairies (one cow and one goat), have this firmly established.

Wineries in the district include Mount Alexander Winery, Sutton Grange Wineryand Langanook Wines, three quality producers of Australian wines. Broad's dairy has been producing cows milk for decades, and the newly established "Holy Goat Cheeses" is producing some of the finest quality French style cheeses in Australia.

Geographical features
Through Sutton Grange runs Myrtle Creek, which flows into the Coliban River and both of them are infested with carp. Sutton Grange is also surrounded by mountains and hills, the highest of which is Mount Alexander. The terrain and soil around Sutton Grange has a high percentage of quartz and granite.

Flora and fauna

Wattles and Eucalypts are the most common large trees and are indigenous to the area. Common native animals seen in the area are grey kangaroos, swamp wallabies (or black wallabies), ring tail, and bush tail possums. Snakes can be a concern in Sutton Grange, as Notechis or (tiger snakes) and eastern brown snakes (see Pseudonaja) are often sighted on private property. Other native snakes sighted also include coppers head, and red-bellied black snakes. Rabbits and redback spiders can also be found.

References

External links

Towns in Victoria (Australia)